Ebrahim Barkhordari (born September 14, 1982 in Qazvin) is an Iranian sport shooter who competes in the men's 10 metre air pistol and 50 metre pistol events. At the 2012 Summer Olympics, he finished 33rd in the qualifying round for the 10 metre air pistol, failing to make the cut for the final.  He also failed to make the final in the 50 metre pistol.

References

Iranian male sport shooters
Living people
Olympic shooters of Iran
Shooters at the 2012 Summer Olympics
Shooters at the 2006 Asian Games
Shooters at the 2010 Asian Games
Shooters at the 2014 Asian Games
Shooters at the 2018 Asian Games
Asian Games competitors for Iran
1982 births
People from Qazvin
21st-century Iranian people